Jean-Philippe Grandclaude (born 4 August 1982 in Fréjus, Var) is a French rugby union footballer who plays for USA Perpignan. He mainly plays at centre.

His professional career started with Béziers in 1998. He played with them until 2003; this included three caps in the 2001–02 European Challenge Cup, and five caps in the 2002-03 Heineken Cup.

In 2003 he joined US Colomiers whom he played for one season. In 2004 Grandclaude joined USA Perpignan and has played for them ever since.

He made his Test debut for France in 2005 when he came on as a substitute against England in France's 18-17 victory. He played once more during the 2005 Six Nations Championship, and did not receive his third cap until 2007 when he faced the All Blacks in New Zealand.

External links

1982 births
Living people
Sportspeople from Fréjus
French rugby union players
Rugby union centres
USA Perpignan players
France international rugby union players
AS Béziers Hérault players
US Colomiers players